The 2020 AFL Women's draft consists of the various periods when the 14 clubs in the AFL Women's competition can recruit players prior to the competition's 2021 season.

Signing and trading period 
A significantly delayed trade period was announced to begin from 3 August and conclude on 12 August, following the suspension of normal list management responsibilities due to COVID-19 pandemic. Concurrently, clubs will be permitted to re-sign existing players and will have until 17 August to do so. Players can be signed for one or two year contracts.

Retirements and delistings

Trades

Delisted free agency 
A delisted free agency period was held from August 17 to August 21, where unsigned players could move to other clubs.

Rookie signings 
In the absence of a rookie draft, each club was permitted to sign players that had not played Australian rules football within the previous three years or been involved in an AFLW high-performance program.

Inactive players 
Following final list lodgements, a number of players experienced changing circumstances that made them unable to participate in the 2021 season. Clubs were granted permission to place these players on an inactive list, gaining end of draft selections to replace them for the one season. Players on each club's inactive list ahead of the 2020 draft are listed below:

1 Barclay passed away on 12 October 2020.

Richmond and West Coast concessions
After poor on-field performances and list builds in 2020, the AFL decided to award special assistance to both Richmond and West Coast. Each club was issued an end-of-first round draft selection which they were required to on-trade to another club in exchange for an established player. Clubs were permitted to package the picks (15 and 16 for Richmond and West Coast, respectively) but could not receive draft selections back in any trade.

Draft 
A draft was held on the night of 6 October 2020. Players will nominate for a single selection pool, aligned to a state or metropolitan region, with players only being eligible to be drafted by clubs operating in that region.

Post-Draft

Undrafted free agency and replacement players 
Due to the shorten season and small lists, replacement players are allowed for players that are placed on the inactive list, often due to injury, work commitments, personal issues or pregnancy. A final free agency period was opened after the conclusion of the draft, allowing clubs that passed on a draft selection to recruit from outside their state-based zone.

See also 
 2020 AFL draft

References 

AFL Women's draft
2020 AFL Women's season
AFL Women's draft
Sports events affected by the COVID-19 pandemic